is a Japanese diver who competed in the 1932 Summer Olympics. In 1932 he finished eighth in the 3 metre springboard event.

External links
Tetsutaro Namae's profile at Sports Reference.com

1909 births
Year of death missing
Japanese male divers
Olympic divers of Japan
Divers at the 1932 Summer Olympics
20th-century Japanese people